Cyclopropanol is an organic compound with the chemical formula C3H6O. It contains a cyclopropyl group with a hydroxyl group attached to it. The compound is highly unstable due to the three-membered ring, and is susceptible to reactions that open the ring. It is highly prone to rearrangement, undergoing structural isomerization to form propanal. This property is useful synthetically: cyclopropanol can be used as a synthon for the homoenolate of propanal. The chemical is also useful as a reagent to introduce a cyclopropyl group into ester, sulfate, and amine linkages. The resulting cyclopropyl-containing compounds have been used in investigations of potential antiviral drugs and of modulators of protein trafficking.

References 

Cycloalkanols
Cyclopropyl compounds